The National Christian Council in Japan (日本キリスト教協議会, Nihon Kirisuto-kyō Kyōgikai) is a Christian ecumenical organization founded in 1948. It is a member of the World Council of Churches and the Christian Conference of Asia.

See also
National Council of Churches in Korea
National Christian Council of China

External links 
Official website
World Council of Churches listing

Christian organizations established in 1948
Members of the World Council of Churches
Christian organizations based in Asia
Christianity in Japan
National councils of churches